École centrale d'électronique (ECE) is a French graduate engineering school of OMNES Education in Paris, Lyon and Bordeaux, France. It was established on 1919.

The College is member of the Union of Independent Grandes Écoles.

It mainly trains in information technologies (information systems, telecoms, networks, IoT, embedded systems, finance, multimedia). It also offers training in health and the link with technology, transport and mobility, energy and the environment.

History 
The College was founded in 1919, under the name École centrale de la TSF, with the aim to train the very first radio operators. At the time, the wireless telegraphy was a new technology, and the school was for a long time the only one to train civilian and military radio operators. Its premises were located at 77 rue de la Verrerie, behind the BHV, in the center of Paris. For a long time, it was called École de la rue de la Lune, because that is where it really developed.

In 1960, its name was changed to École centrale de TSF et d'électronique, and in 1963 to École centrale d'électronique. It adds to its curriculum the application of transistors.

ECE is recognized by the French State since 1964 and accredited by the Commission des Titres d'Ingénieur since 1990.

References

External links 
 

Engineering universities and colleges in France
Grandes écoles
Universities in Île-de-France
Universities and colleges in Lyon
Education in Bordeaux